Poolsbrook Country Park is a park in Poolsbrook, North East Derbyshire, England.

History
It was the site of the former Colliery. It has been transformed from dereliction into a country park and amenities area.

The cafe is run by Friends of Poolsbrook Country Park, a group of local volunteers giving their free time to build the community spirit in the park.

Since the beginning of 2008, the park has been partly occupied by the Caravan Club, who have built a camp site with eco-friendly facilities. 

The site adjoins the Trans Pennine Trail.

Events
A Parkrun takes place in the park every Saturday morning.

References and notes

External links
 Official Website run by the Friends of Poolsbrook Country Park

Country parks in Derbyshire